Colonel Blimp is a British cartoon character by cartoonist David Low, first drawn for Lord Beaverbrook's London Evening Standard in April 1934. Blimp is pompous, irascible, jingoistic, and stereotypically British, identifiable by his walrus moustache and the interjection "Gad, Sir!"

Low claimed that he developed the character after overhearing two military men in a Turkish bath declare that cavalry officers should be entitled to wear their spurs inside tanks. The character was named after the barrage balloon, which was known as a blimp.

Character
Blimp issues proclamations from the Turkish bath, wrapped in his towel and brandishing some mundane weapon to emphasize his passion on some issue of current affairs. Red-faced with rage and emotion, he often makes confused pronouncements. Blimp's phrasing often includes direct contradiction, as though upon starting the sentence he did not know how the sentence was to end.  His initial words were always a part of an emotional catchphrase. For instance: "Gad, Sir! Mr Lansbury is right. The League of Nations should insist on peace — except of course in the case of war.", or: "Gad, Sir! Lord Bunk is right. The government is marching over the edge of an abyss, and the nation must march solidly behind them." Blimp is usually depicted speaking to a cartoon version of David Low, the cartoon's creator, and Blimp's comments are not infrequently directed at the opinions of Lord Beaverbrook, the owner of the newspaper in which the cartoon appeared.

Blimp was a satire on the reactionary opinions of the British establishment of the 1930s and 1940s.  The cartoon was intended to criticise attitudes of isolationism, impatience with the concerns of common people, and a lack of enthusiasm for democracy.  These were attitudes which Low, a New Zealander, considered as being common in British politics. Although Low described his character Blimp as "a symbol of stupidity", he lessened the insult to the British upper class by adding that "stupid people are quite nice".

Legacy
The character has earned a legacy as a clichéd phrase – very reactionary opinions are characterised as "Colonel Blimp" statements.

George Orwell and Tom Wintringham made especially extensive use of the term "Blimps" to refer to this type of military officer, Orwell in his articles and Wintringham in his books How to Reform the Army and People's War. In his 1941 essay "The Lion and the Unicorn", Orwell referred to two important sub-sections of the middle class, one of which was the military and imperialistic middle class, nicknamed the Blimps, and characterised by the "half-pay (i.e retired) colonel with his bull neck and diminutive brain". He added that they had been losing their vitality during the past thirty years, "writhing impotently under the changes that were happening".

Herbert Read has also used the term to describe people who were strongly hostile to modern art.

The term "Blimp" continues to be referenced from time to time. In a 1994 article published in The New York Review of Books, John Banville recalled a televised exchange between an elderly lady and Kingsley Amis as "an endearing moment, in which one glimpsed the warm and funny man that Amis used to be before he decided, some time in the 1960s, to turn himself into a literary Colonel Blimp". In a 2006 book, historian Christopher Clark used the term "blimpish" to characterise the Prussian Field Marshal Mollendorf (1724–1816), who distinguished himself as an officer in the Seven Years' War but whose conservatism and opposition to military reform were considered to have contributed to Prussia's defeat in the Battle of Jena in 1806. In his review of Garner's Modern American Usage, David Foster Wallace referred to the "Colonel Blimp's rage" of prescriptivist journalists like William Safire.

The graphic novel series The League of Extraordinary Gentlemen, which depicts numerous literary characters interacting with each other, includes Horatio Blimp as an overconfident major of the British army who commands the initial strike against the Martians of H. G. Wells' The War of the Worlds.

Film
During 1943 the team Powell and Pressburger wrote, produced, and directed a movie titled The Life and Death of Colonel Blimp (1943).  Filmed during wartime, the movie portrayed the life of an admirable British officer named Clive Candy.  The story encouraged the audience to accept that although the officer was honorable, with time his opinions had become dated, and that winning a modern war required irregular means. The classic British movie featured Roger Livesey in the title role, Deborah Kerr, and Anton Walbrook. The "Blimp" character was not actually called "Blimp" other than in the title, nor did he die.

See also
Horatio Blimp
Sir Bufton Tufton
Gammon

References 

1934 comics debuts
British comic strips
Blimp, Colonel
British satire
Comics characters introduced in 1934
Fictional British Army officers
Blimp, Colonel
Gag cartoon comics
Male characters in comics
Military comics
Military humor
Satirical comics

fr:Colonel Blimp